Craig Heaney (born August 1973) is a British screen, stage and radio actor. He may be best known as Private Roy W. Cobb in the award-winning ten-part mini-series Band of Brothers (2001). He played Phil in Danny Cannon's 2005 football movie Goal! and its 2009 sequel, Goal III: Taking on the World. He also appeared in the 2008 Christopher Nolan film The Dark Knight as a ferry passenger.

Heaney's other television roles include the sweet-hearted Billy Breeze in Breeze Block, Larry Boyd in P.O.W and Mick in Distant Shores. He has also had appearances in such British television mainstays as Casualty, Peak Practice and Heartbeat. His radio work includes Two Planks and a Passion, written and co-directed by Anthony Minghella for BBC Radio 4.

He trained at the Academy Drama School, where he was the recipient of the Stage Scholarship.

Partial filmography
Out of Depth (2000) - Armed police officer
Band of Brothers (2001) - Roy W. Cobb
Goal! (2005) - Phil
Goal II: Living the Dream (2007) - Phil
The Dark Knight (2008) - Passenger
Goal III: Taking on the World (2009) - Phil

External links

Spotlight webpage

Living people
British male film actors
British male radio actors
British male television actors
Alumni of the Academy Drama School
Place of birth missing (living people)
1973 births